Rahim Ouédraogo (born 8 October 1980 in Bobo-Dioulasso) is a Burkinabé footballer.

Ouédraogo, whose preferred position on the field is defender, joined FC Twente at the age of 16. He played for Twente until 2007. In between, in 2000/2001 he played one season at FC Zwolle, on loan. Ouédraogo was a member of the Burkinabé 2004 African Cup of Nations team, who finished bottom of their group in the first round of competition, thus failing to secure qualification for the quarter-finals.

He joined Manisaspor on 5 August 2009, signing a two-year contract with the Turkish club. On 23 December 2009, his contract was mutually terminated. In January 2010 he returned to FC Emmen, where he signed until the end of the season.

In 2012 he founded Rahimo FC.

External links
 FC Twente Biography 
 

1980 births
Living people
Burkinabé footballers
Burkina Faso international footballers
2000 African Cup of Nations players
2004 African Cup of Nations players
FC Twente players
PEC Zwolle players
Xanthi F.C. players
Heracles Almelo players
FC Emmen players
Manisaspor footballers
Eredivisie players
Eerste Divisie players
Süper Lig players
Super League Greece players
Burkinabé expatriate footballers
Expatriate footballers in the Netherlands
Burkinabé expatriate sportspeople in the Netherlands
Expatriate footballers in Greece
Burkinabé expatriate sportspeople in Greece
Expatriate footballers in Turkey
People from Bobo-Dioulasso
Association football defenders
21st-century Burkinabé people